Hrabovec nad Laborcom is a village and municipality in Humenné District in the Prešov Region of north-east Slovakia.

History
In historical records the village was first mentioned in 1463.

Geography
The municipality lies at an altitude of 212 metres and covers an area of 13.539 km².
It has a population of about 595 people.

References

External links
 

Villages and municipalities in Humenné District
Zemplín (region)